Maestros is a 2000 Spanish comedy film directed by Óscar del Caz starring veteran actors Manuel Alexandre, Alvaro de Luna, and Jesús Guzmán with supporting roles from Conrado San Martín, Frank Braña, and Tomás Zori.

Cast

References

2000 films
Spanish comedy films
2000s Spanish films